In the 1955 Wimbledon Championships men's singles event, Tony Trabert defeated Kurt Nielsen in the final, 6–3, 7–5, 6–1 to win the gentlemen's singles tennis title. Jaroslav Drobný was the defending champion but lost in the quarterfinals to Tony Trabert.

It was the second of two Men's Singles competitions at Wimbledon in which an unseeded Nielsen had progressed to the final, and he remains the only unseeded player to achieve this twice.

Seeds

  Tony Trabert (champion)
  Ken Rosewall (semifinals)
  Vic Seixas (second round)
  Lew Hoad (quarterfinals)
  Rex Hartwig (third round)
  Jaroslav Drobný (quarterfinals)
  Budge Patty (semifinals)
  Sven Davidson (quarterfinals)

Draw

Finals

Top half

Section 1

Section 2

Section 3

Section 4

Bottom half

Section 5

Section 6

Section 7

Section 8

References

External links

Men's Singles
Wimbledon Championship by year – Men's singles